The Charles Martel class was a planned class of ironclad barbette ships of the French Navy. The class comprised two ships, Charles Martel and Brennus, and represented an incremental improvement over the preceding , being larger, but carrying the same main battery of four  guns in single mounts. Details of the ships' construction are unclear and contradictory, with various sources reporting that both ships were laid down, or that only Brennus was begun; neither ship was launched before they were cancelled in 1884 or 1886. Some sources indicate that Brennus was redesigned and completed as France's first pre-dreadnought battleship, but most other historians dispute the idea.

Background

After the Franco-Prussian War of 1870–1871, the French Navy embarked on a construction program to strengthen the fleet in 1872 and to replace older vessels that had been built in the 1860s. The French initially viewed the ships as not worthy of concern, but by 1877, public pressure over the new Italian vessels prompted the Navy's  (Board of Construction) to respond, beginning with the barbette ship  and following with six vessels carrying 100-ton guns of French design. The first of these were the two s, which carried their guns in open barbettes, all on the centerline, with one forward and two aft.

By the early 1880s, the very large guns had fallen out of favor in the French Navy, so the remaining four ships, to be laid down beginning in 1880, were redesigned with smaller but equally powerful weapons. The first vessel that was laid down, had to be reworked after it was realized that the ship was too small for the intended displacement. The remaining three ships, which had not yet been laid down, could be enlarged to the necessary dimensions. All four ships arranged their main battery in a lozenge pattern with one forward, one aft, and a wing mount on either side amidships to maximize end-on fire (which was emphasized by those who favored ramming attacks).

At the same time, developments with quick-firing guns rendered the generation of French capital ships designed in the 1870s and early 1880s dangerously vulnerable to damage above the waterline. These ships used shallow waterline belt armor to protect their sides, but most of their hulls were unprotected by armor altogether. Many navies began to incorporate thin side protection above the belt to deal with the threat. Further complicating matters were the developments of self-propelled torpedoes and small, fast torpedo boats that posed an existential threat to the battleship-dominated fleets of the European navies.

Development and cancellation
The fleet program of 1880 projected a total of six new ironclad battleships; the first four were to be the three Marceaus and Hoche. The remaining pair of vessels was due to begin construction in 1882. An initial plan by the naval engineer Louis de Bussy proposed a ship modeled on the British ironclad , carrying a main battery of four  guns in a pair of gun turrets arranged en echelon amidships. Before work on the vessels began, the French naval command reconsidered and opted for an improved Marceau, and a new design was prepared by Charles Ernest Huin, who had designed the Marceaus and Hoche. The new design repeated the lozenge arrangement of the main battery in single mounts.

The exact timeline for the design and construction of the ships are unclear. According to the historians John Jordan and Philip Caresse, Huin's design was approved in January 1885 and work on the two ships, Charles Martel and Brennus, began that year in Toulon and Lorient, respectively. They credit Admiral Théophile Aube, who became the French Minister of Marine in January 1886, as immediately suspending work on the new ships upon becoming the naval minister.

He remained committed to completing the Marceau class and Hoche, as they were already well advanced in construction, but was unwilling to authorize construction of any new vessels. This is corroborated by the 1887 edition of the contemporary journal The Naval Annual, which reported that the decision was made to suspend the vessels on 24 October 1884. But Thomas Brassey noted that the ships had been ordered in 1882 and that at least some work on the keel for Brennus had already been completed by October 1884, though Charles Martel had not yet been laid down.

In 1887, Aube left the ministry and his replacement, Édouard Barbey, disagreed with his predecessor over the future composition of the French fleet. Huin suggested reworking the design for Brennus, which Barbey accepted, resulting in France's first pre-dreadnought battleship, . There is some confusion as to the ship's fate. Jordan and Caresse seem to indicate that the two vessels were one in the same, stating that "work on the partially built Brennus resumed in 1889." But in another publication, Caresse provides a new keel-laying date for Brennus on 2 January 1889, and Brassey indicates the two were different vessels. Speaking of Charles Martel, the historian Luc Feron states more plainly, instructing readers to "[not] confuse this one with the 12,000-ton battleship of the 1890 program which was actually built." Charles Martel was scrapped in Toulon and some of her components were reused in other projects. Her name was reused in the later battleship , also designed by Huin.

Characteristics
They were steel-hulled vessels. Their propulsion system was to have consisted of three marine steam engines of unrecorded type, each driving a screw propeller.

The ships' primary armament was to have consisted of four 340 mm guns carried in individual mounts in the French lozenge arrangement. These would have been supported by a secondary battery of eight  guns in individual casemate mounts. Close-range defense against torpedo boats would have been provided by seven light auto-cannon of unrecorded type. The ships would have been protected with compound armor; their belt was to have been , but unlike previous French ironclads, it did not cover the entire length of the hull. An identical thickness covered their main battery barbettes.

Footnotes

Notes

Citations

References
 
 
 
 
 
 
 
 
 

Ironclad classes
Ironclad warships of the French Navy
Ship classes of the French Navy